Asuri is an Austroasiatic language spoken by the Asur people, part of the Munda branch.
Asuri has many Dravidian loanwords due to contact with Kurukh.

The majority of Asuri speakers reside in the Gumla district of Chota Nagpur. In addition, there are smaller groups of Asuri speakers in Chhattisgarh, West Bengal, Odisha.

Ethnologue states that Birjia is a dialect of Asuri, but also that there is a related language Birjia; it is not clear if these refer to the same thing. However, Anderson (2008:195), based on Prasad (1961:314), suggests that Birjia (Binjhia) may be an Indo-Aryan language, although the Birjia are an ethnic subgroup of the Asuri tribe, along with the Asur proper and the Agariya.

Majhwar is unclassified, but based on location and other clues, it may turn out to be a dialect of Asuri. If so, its 35,000 speakers (reported in 1995, out of an ethnic group of 175,000) would make it the most populous form of Asuri.

Asuri is considered to be an endangered language. One important reason for its distinction as endangered is due to a lack of any written form of the language. It exists only as a spoken language There are a total of 31 phonemes in Asuri, made up of twenty-six "segmental" and five "supra-segmental" phonemes. Of the former, there are twenty-one consonants and five vowels.

The Asur language is listed in UNESCO Interactive Atlas of the World's Languages in Danger. Using mobile radio, the Asur community, a Particularly Vulnerable Tribal Group(PVTG) in Jharkhand, has been spreading the popularity of the language within their geographical limits. News and entertainment programmes are broadcast on speakers at public places.

Geographical distribution
Ethnologue lists the following districts and states where Asuri is spoken.

Jharkhand: southern Palamau district, northern Ranchi district, Gumla district, and Lohardaga district of the Chota Nagpur Plateau
Chhattisgarh: Raigarh district and Jashpur district area
Odisha: Sambalpur district
West Bengal

References

Munda languages
Endangered languages of India